Long Flat is a rural locality in the Gympie Region, Queensland, Australia.

Road infrastructure
The Mary Valley Road (State Route 51) runs through from north to south.

Heritage listings 
Long Flat has the following heritage listings:

 Mary Valley Road: Lagoon Pocket Methodist Church
 705 Mary Valley Road: Long Flat Hall

References 

Gympie Region
Localities in Queensland